David Waller (1920–1997) was an English actor.

David Waller may also refer to:

 David Jewett Waller, Sr. (1815–1893), American Presbyterian minister and civic leader
 David Jewett Waller, Jr. (1846–1941), minister and educator in Pennsylvania